Steven Gonzales is an American film editor. Best known for his work on independent films, Gonzales is a 1998 graduate of The North Carolina School of the Arts School of Filmmaking where he now works as Head of Post-Production.  He edited or co-edited films such as George Washington, All the Real Girls, Undertow, and Shotgun Stories.

Filmography

References

External links

University of North Carolina School of the Arts alumni
American film editors
Living people
Year of birth missing (living people)